In relation to motorsport, Group T1 is a set of technical specifications for prototype cross-country cars used in off-road Cross-Country Rallying (also called Rally Raid). The group is governed by the Fédération Internationale de l'Automobile (FIA) and defined in appendix J, article 285 of its International Sporting Code. The cars are single unit builds and may be based on a spaceframe chassis unlike the strict series production bodyshell requirement in Group T2. However, the engine must come from, or be derived from a production car able to be homologated in Group A, Group GT or Group T2. The cars must be powered by one engine and without driving aids such as traction control or ABS.

History 
Group T1 was first introduced in 1990 when the generic Group T, introduced the year before, was divided into four specific categories of cross-country vehicles. Until 2003 T1 was for series production cross-country cars, and prototype cars were placed in Group T3. However the modern arrangement, with T1 vehicles in Category II for competition vehicles, has been in place since 2004. These cars have been competing in Baja Cross Country Rallies, Rally Raids and Marathon Rallies since their inception, including in the FIA World Cup for Cross Country Rallies.

Classes 

When competing in the FIA World Rally-Raid Championship, which includes the long established Dakar Rally, there are four classes within the group:

 T1.U - 'Ultimate' cars powered by electric motors, hydrogen combustion engine or hybrid combustion and electric
 T1.1 - 4x4 cars (includes T1+ cross-country-type vehicles which permit larger size vehicles)
 T1.2 - 2x4 cars
 T1.3 - Cars complying with SCORE International regulations

Cars 

Examples of each class include:

 T1.U
 Audi RS Q e-tron
 T1.1
 Mini John Cooper Works Rally
 Mini All4 Racing
 Bowler Wildcat
 Prodrive Hunter
 Toyota GR DKR Hilux
 T1.2
 Peugeot 3008 DKR
 Mini John Cooper Works Buggy
 T1.3
 Volkswagen Tarek
 Chevrolet LCR30

See also
Cross-Country Cars
 Group T1 - prototype
 Group T2 - series production
Lightweight Cross-Country Vehicles
 Group T3 - prototype
 Group T4 - series production side-by-side vehicles
Cross-Country Trucks
 Group T5 - prototype and series production

References

External Links 
FIA World Rally Raid Championship

FIA Cross Country Rallies Regulations

Dakar Rally
Off-road racing
Pre-Cross Country Rally World Cup races
Fédération Internationale de l'Automobile
Racing car classes
Rally raids